Gavino is a rural locality (a village) in Korotovskoye Rural Settlement, Cherepovetsky District, Vologda Oblast, Russia. The population was 24 as of a 2002 census. There are 3 streets.

Geography 
Dubrovo is the nearest rural locality.

References 

Rural localities in Cherepovetsky District